Giovanni Massiccio (fl. 1620s) was an Italian composer who featured in Ghirlanda sacra, 1625.

References

17th-century Italian composers
Italian male composers
17th-century male musicians